Electoral reform in California refers to efforts to change election and voting laws in the U.S. state of California.

Ranked-choice voting

In 2002, San Francisco adopted instant-runoff voting in part because of low turnout in its runoff elections. The system is called "Ranked Choice Voting" there. In 2006, Oakland, California passed Measure O, adopting instant runoff voting. In 2006, the city council of Davis voted 3–2 to place a measure on the ballot to recommend use of single transferable vote for city elections; the measure was approved by the electorate. The state legislature approved 12 September 2007 AB 1294 which codifies ranked choice elections in state law and allows general law cities (those without charters) to use these election methods. Governor Schwarzenegger vetoed this bill. In September 2019, the state legislature approved a similar measure, SB 212. Governor Newsom vetoed this bill.

Californians for Electoral Reform is a non-profit organization which promotes the use of ranked choice voting at all levels of government (city, county, state legislature, school boards, etc.).

Allocation of electoral votes
Currently, California's 55 electoral votes are designated to the candidate winning the statewide popular vote.

National Popular Vote Interstate Compact

In 2006, both houses of the California Legislature passed AB 2948, a bill to join the National Popular Vote Interstate Compact and designate California's electoral votes to the ticket winning the popular vote nationwide. Hours before it was scheduled to become law, Governor Arnold Schwarzenegger vetoed it.

The Compact was approved in 2011, signed by Governor Jerry Brown.

Electors by Congressional district 

Republicans proposed a rival reform to allocate electoral votes by Congressional district, similarly to Maine and Nebraska. The California Democratic Party calculated that this would likely result in 22 of California's electoral votes going to the Republican candidate in the 2008 U.S. Presidential election.

Redistricting
In November 2005, the electorate rejected Proposition 77 which called for a panel of three retired judges to draw boundaries for California's Senate, Assembly, Congressional and Board of Equalization districts. It had been viewed with suspicion due to its Republican backers. FairVote suggested that independent redistricting would help avoid gerrymandering, but the major reform needed was the replacement of single member districts with multi-member districts. This would make it possible to implement single transferable vote or other proportional representation systems.

In November 2008, voters in California passed Proposition 11 to reform how electoral districts are drawn in the state. The proposition called for a commission of fourteen non-politician voters to draw boundaries for the Senate, Assembly, and Board of Equalization districts. The commission is to be made up of five Democrats, five Republicans, and four commissioners from neither major party.

In November 2010, Proposition 20 was passed, which put the commission in charge of drawing United States House of Representatives districts in California.

Nonpartisan blanket primaries
In the June 2010 elections, voters approved Proposition 14, establishing the nonpartisan blanket primary as the election method for state and federal offices except for local, non-partisan, and presidential elections.

Expansion of the electorate
In California, voting rights are restored to felons automatically after release from prison and discharge from parole. Probationers may vote. Prior to 1978, only persons who had a certified medical excuse, or who could demonstrate that they would be out of town on Election Day, were allowed to vote absentee. Today, any voter may vote absentee. In 2004, State Sen. John Vasconcellos (D-Santa Clara) proposed a youth suffrage constitutional amendment called Training Wheels for Citizenship that would give 14-year-olds a quarter vote, 16-year-olds a half vote, and 17-year-olds a full vote.

In 2012, state lawmakers passed a bill to adopt Election Day voter registration with the law expected to take effect in 2016.

In 2015, California became the second state to pass automatic voter registration with initial implementation expected in the second half of 2016. For context, state officials estimate there are 6.6 million citizens in California who are eligible but not registered to vote.

See also
Electoral reform in the United States
California Counts
For the effects of Open Primaries and Neutral Party Redistricting upon the 2012 General Election results, see Politics of California#California delegation to the U. S. House of Representatitives

References

External links
Californians for Electoral Reform.
FairVote California.

California
Politics of California